Michael John Harvey (born 29 August 1958) is an Australian musician, singer-songwriter, composer, arranger and record producer. A multi-instrumentalist, he is best known for his long-term collaborations with Nick Cave, with whom he formed The Boys Next Door, The Birthday Party and Nick Cave and the Bad Seeds.

Early life
Born in Rochester, Victoria, Australia, Harvey moved to the suburbs of Melbourne in his childhood. His father was a Church of England vicar, and the family lived adjacent to the father's church; first in Ormond and later in Ashburton. Harvey sang in the church choir from an early age.

Harvey, his elder brother Philip, and younger brother Sebastian all attended the private boys' school Caulfield Grammar School. It was at school in the early 1970s that Harvey met fellow students Nick Cave and Phill Calvert, as well as Tracy Pew. A rock group was formed with Cave (vocals), Harvey (guitar), Calvert (drums), and other students on guitar, bass and saxophone. The band played at parties and school functions, with a repertoire of Lou Reed, David Bowie, Roxy Music, Alice Cooper and the Sensational Alex Harvey Band, among others. Harvey was also a member of the school choir (conducted by actor Norman Kaye), and took extracurricular lessons from Bruce Clarke, the jazz guitarist.

Music career

The Birthday Party

After their final school year in 1975, the band decided to continue with Pew as bassist. Greatly influenced by the punk explosion of 1976, which saw Australian bands The Saints and Radio Birdman make their first recordings and tours, The Boys Next Door, as Harvey's band was now called, began performing fast, original new wave material. Harvey's guitar style was influenced by James Williamson of The Stooges and Paul Weller of The Jam. The Boys Next Door regularly played at Melbourne pubs between 1977 and 1980. Rowland S. Howard joined the band in 1978, bringing with him a chaotic feedback guitar style.

After extensive touring, recordings, and moderate success in Australia, the Boys Next Door relocated to London, England in 1980, and changed their name to The Birthday Party. Harvey's girlfriend Katy Beale followed the band to London. This period was defined by innovative and aggressive music composition, underpinned by Harvey's guitar playing. The band moved to West Berlin, Germany in 1982, but without Calvert; Harvey transitioned from guitar to drums.

Crime and the City Solution

After the breakup of The Birthday Party while initiating the early recordings of what would become The Bad Seeds with Nick Cave, Harvey contacted his friend Simon Bonney, with whom he reformed Bonney's old Australian band Crime & the City Solution. Rowland S. Howard, Harry Howard (bass) and Epic Soundtracks (drums), all of whom a few years later would form the basis of These Immortal Souls, also participated. This line-up of the band found its peak and demise with its appearance in the Wim Wenders film Wings of Desire. Bonney then stayed in Berlin and formed the next line-up of the band with his partner Bronwyn Adams, Harvey (drums), Alexander Hacke of Einstürzende Neubauten (guitar), Chrislo Haas of Liaisons Dangereuses and D.A.F. (synthesiser), and Thomas Stern (bass). This line-up made three studio albums and toured until 1991.

Nick Cave and The Bad Seeds 

Harvey and Cave formed Nick Cave and The Bad Seeds in 1983. Harvey was principally the drummer on the first 2 albums before line-up changes saw him move to the bass until the arrival of Martyn P. Casey in 1990 when he moved back to guitar, his original instrument.

Throughout the '80s and '90s Harvey was the band member charged with the responsibility for the production of the recordings along with Cave. His arrangement skills also saw him putting together most of the band’s string arrangements during this time and led to the perception of him as a kind of musical director. He also managed much of the band’s business affairs right up until his departure. Harvey remained with the Bad Seeds for 25 years until his last show in Perth, Australia on 20 January 2009, when he cited both professional and personal factors as reasons for leaving. Regarding Cave, Harvey informed the media: I'm confident Nick [Cave] will continue to be a creative force and that this is the right time to pass on my artistic and managerial role to what has become a tremendous group of people who can support him in his endeavours, both musically and organisationally.

In 2010, Harvey explained further that his frustration with song arrangements strained his relationship with Cave; and a desire to spend time with family was also a significant reason for his decision. The split marked the end of a 36-year-long collaboration between Harvey and Cave.

Anita Lane

Harvey worked extensively with Nick Cave’s muse and partner of many years on two albums - Dirty Pearl (1993) and Sex O’Clock (2001).

The Wallbangers
In 2007, the Spanish label Bang! Records released a four-track EP by Harvey's retro rock band The Wallbangers, called Kick the Drugs  featuring songs written by Harvey alone, and songs he co-wote with Tex Perkins and Loene Carmen. Harvey sings and plays guitars.

Solo
After Bonney left Crime & the City Solution for a solo career in the United States, Harvey recorded two solo albums of Serge Gainsbourg songs, translated from French into English: Intoxicated Man (1995) and Pink Elephants (1997). He has also collaborated with UK rock musician PJ Harvey (no relation), and produced for other Australian artists, including Anita Lane, Robert Forster, Conway Savage and Rowland S. Howard. Harvey's third solo release, One Man's Treasure, was issued in September 2005.

He undertook his first solo tours of Europe and Australia in 2006, accompanied by fellow Bad Seeds Thomas Wydler and James Johnston, as well as Melbourne-based double bassist Rosie Westbrook. His next solo record, 2007's Two of Diamonds, was recorded with this group, as was the 2008 live album Three Sisters – Live at Bush Hall.

In February 2008, Harvey and Westbrook played as a support act for PJ Harvey on her Australian tour, with both Harveys also performing on stage together. Prior to the tour, Harvey had worked extensively with PJ Harvey over a 12-year period: he was a recording musician on her albums To Bring You My Love and Is This Desire?, and co-produced the album Stories from the City, Stories from the Sea in 2000.

In both 2008 and 2009, he joined the five remaining members of The Triffids for a series of performances at the Sydney Festival, Arts Centre Melbourne and Perth International Arts Festival, celebrating the music and the memory of David McComb. Harvey is also a contributor to the 2009 edited collection, Vagabond Holes: David McComb and the Triffids, edited by Australian academics Niall Lucy and Chris Coughran.

During 2008 and 2009 Harvey worked on what would be Rowland S. Howard’s last album Pop Crimes playing drums with his future close collaborator J.P. Shilo providing bass and violin. The album was released just a few months before Howard succumbed to liver cancer in late 2009.

Harvey released Sketches from the Book of the Dead — the first solo album written entirely by himself — in early 2011 on the Mute record label. The 11-track album was recorded in Melbourne, between a Port Melbourne studio and his own Grace Lane music room. Harvey played most of the instruments, while Westbrook played double bass, Shilo played accordion, violin and occasional guitar, and Xanthe Waite contributed backing vocals. Harvey explained in a promotional interview that he does not perceive himself as a "songwriter" in the traditional sense, whereby the practice is: "something they [actual songwriters, as perceived by Harvey] have done historically and something they've worked on as central to what they are as an artist". He also confirmed that the opening track, "October Boy", is about Rowland S. Howard.

Harvey once again co-produced and recorded for PJ Harvey during the creation of her eighth studio album, Let England Shake. The 2011 release was supported by a world tour in the same year, which also included Harvey as a touring musician.

His sixth solo studio album, titled FOUR (Acts of Love), released on Mute in 2013, features original compositions by Mick Harvey alongside a song by PJ Harvey ("Glorious") and interpretations of The Saints’ "The Story of Love", Van Morrison’s "The Way Young Lovers Do", Exuma’s "Summertime in New York" and Roy Orbison’s "Wild Hearts (Run Out of Time)". FOUR (Acts of Love) was recorded at Grace Lane, North Melbourne and Atlantis Sound, Melbourne, and features regular collaborators Westbrook on double bass and Shilo on guitar and violin.

Delirium Tremens (2016) is the third instalment in Harvey's project of translating Serge Gainsbourg's songs into English, after Intoxicated Man and Pink Elephants. Delirium Tremens was recorded in Melbourne with Harvey's Antipodean-based core live band. 10 songs were tracked at Birdland Studios; the project then relocated to Berlin, where a further nine songs were recorded with Toby Dammit (The Stooges, The Residents) and Bertrand Burgalat (of French label Tricatel), who was the string arranger on the first two volumes.

Harvey again collaborated with PJ Harvey in early 2015, playing and singing on her album The Hope Six Demolition Project. The following year he joined PJ on tour promoting the album, which was released in April 2016.

In 2018, Harvey released the album The Fall and Rise of Edgar Bourchier and the Horrors of War in collaboration with author Christopher Richard Barker.

Personal life

Harvey divides his time between Europe and Melbourne. He has one son with his partner, Katy Beale, who is a painter. As of 2014, the family resided in the inner-city Melbourne suburb of North Melbourne.

As part of his interview with Brisbane writer Andrew McMillen for the book Talking Smack: Honest Conversations About Drugs, Harvey concluded with his perspective on illicit drug use:

Discography

Solo albums
 Intoxicated Man (1995)
 Pink Elephants (1997)
 One Man's Treasure (2005)
 Two of Diamonds (2007)
 Sketches from the Book of the Dead (2011)
 Four (Acts of Love) (2013)
 Delirium Tremens (2016)
 Intoxicated Women (2017)
 The Fall and Rise of Edgar Bourchier and the Horrors of War (with Christopher Richard Barker) (2018)
 Phantasmagoria in Blue (with Amanda Acevedo) (2023)

Soundtracks

Albums 
 Ghosts... of the Civil Dead (1989/1990)
 And the Ass Saw the Angel (1998/1999)
 Australian Rules (2003)
Waves of Anzac (2020) from 2015 documentary series Why ANZAC?

Short scores 

 Altea Marea & Vaterland (1993)
 "Altea Marea" (1991)
 "Identy-Kid" (1987)
 "Vaterland" (1992) with Alexander Hacke
 "Totes Geld" (1987)
 "The Real Power of Television" (1987)

 Chopper (2000)
 Motion Picture Music (2006)
 "Lighting Fires"
 "Sparrow"
 "Rien ne vas plus"
 "Frank Hurley: The Man Who Made History"
 "Rosehill"
 "Go for Gold"
 Suburban Mayhem (2006)

EPs 

 The Journey (2019, with the Letter String Quartet)

Singles 

 "A Suitcase in Berlin"

Live albums 

 Three Sisters – Live at Bush Hall (2008)

Albums produced for other artists
 Robert Forster, Danger in the Past (1990)
 Once Upon A Time, In The Blink of an Eye (1992)
 Anita Lane, Dirty Pearl (1993)
 The Cruel Sea, The Honeymoon Is Over (1993) (co-producer) (AUS No. 4, also ARIA award for "Best Album" 1994)
 Congo Norvell, Music to Remember Him By (1994, co-producer)
 PJ Harvey, Dance Hall at Louse Point (1996, co-producer)
 PJ Harvey Stories from the City, Stories from the Sea (2000, co-producer) (UK No. 23, US No. 42, AUS No. 20, and winner of the Mercury Prize 2001)
 Anita Lane, Sex O'Clock (2001)
 Rowland S. Howard, Pop Crimes (2009)
 Hunter Dienna, self-titled EP (2010)
 The Nearly Brothers, You Can't Hide From Your Yesterdays (2010)
 PJ Harvey, Let England Shake (2011, co-producer) (UK No. 8, US No. 32, AUS No. 6, and winner of the Mercury Prize 2011)
 Mazgani, Common Ground (2013, with John Parish)

Compositions 

 To Have & to Hold (1996) with Nick Cave & Blixa Bargeld

Awards

ARIA Music Awards
The ARIA Music Awards is an annual awards ceremony that recognises excellence, innovation, and achievement across all genres of Australian music. They commenced in 1987. 

! 
|-
| 1997
| To Have & to Hold (with Blixa Bargeld and Nick Cave)
| Best Original Soundtrack, Cast or Show Album
| 
|rowspan="2" | 
|-
| 2003
| Australian Rules
| Best Original Soundtrack, Cast or Show Album
| 
| 
|-

 2001 Mercury Prize: Best Album: PJ Harvey Stories from the City, Stories from the Sea (Mick Harvey: co-producer)
 2006 AFI Awards: Best Original Music Score (Suburban Mayhem)
 2011 Mercury Prize: Best Album: PJ Harvey Let England Shake (Mick Harvey: co-producer)

See also
 List of Caulfield Grammar School people

References

Sources
Inner City Sound – Clinton Walker
Bad Seed: A biography of Nick Cave – Ian Johnston
The life and music of Nick Cave: An illustrated biography – Maximilian Dax & Johannes Beck
 http://musicalbanter.com/?p=539

External links
 Official website
 Mick Harvey at Mute Records
 

1958 births
Living people
ARIA Award winners
Australian rock bass guitarists
Male bass guitarists
Australian rock drummers
Male drummers
Australian rock guitarists
Australian male singers
Australian record producers
People educated at Caulfield Grammar School
Musicians from Melbourne
Noise rock musicians
Nick Cave and the Bad Seeds members
Mute Records artists
Australian punk rock musicians
The Birthday Party (band) members
Crime & the City Solution members
Australian male guitarists